Uta Levka (born 1942) is a former German film and television actress active during the 1960s and early 1970s. She was discovered by the actress Maria Schell while working at the Bavaria Studios in Munich and appeared in a succession of glamorous roles. She appeared in three of the popular Edgar Wallace adaptations of Rialto Film. She played the lead in the 1967 film Carmen, Baby.

Selected filmography
 Der unheimliche Mönch (1965)
 The Hunchback of Soho (1966)
 Black Market of Love (1966)
 The Alley Cats (1966)
 Carmen, Baby (1967)
 Operation St. Peter's (1967)
 The Hound of Blackwood Castle (1968)
 De Sade (1969)
 The Oblong Box (1969)
 Scream and Scream Again (1970)

References

Bibliography

External links

1942 births
Living people
People from Cottbus
People from the Province of Brandenburg
German film actresses
20th-century German actresses